Ndolo may be,

Ndolo language
Ndolo Airport
Wilson Ndolo Ayah